Marit Malm Frafjord (born 25 November 1985) is a former Norwegian handball player.

Achievements
Champions League: 
Bronze Medalist: 2015, 2018
Cup Winners' Cup: 
Winner: 2014
Finalist: 2007, 2012  
Summer Olympics:
Winner: 2008, 2012
Bronze Medalist: 2016, 2020
World Championship:
Winner: 2011
Silver Medalist: 2007
Bronze Medalist: 2009
European Championship:
Winner: 2006, 2008, 2010, 2016, 2020
Silver Medalist: 2012
EHF Cup:
Finalist: 2019
Norwegian Championship:
Winner: 2014/2015, 2015/2016
Norwegian Cup:
Winner: 2007, 2014, 2015
Finalist: 2004, 2005, 2006, 2008, 2009

Individual awards
 All-Star Team Best Line Player of the EHF Champions League: 2017

References

External links

 
 
 Marit Malm Frafjord at the Norwegian Handball Federation 
 
 

1985 births
Living people
Norwegian female handball players
Handball players at the 2008 Summer Olympics
Handball players at the 2012 Summer Olympics
Handball players at the 2016 Summer Olympics
Olympic handball players of Norway
Olympic gold medalists for Norway
Olympic bronze medalists for Norway
Olympic medalists in handball
Medalists at the 2008 Summer Olympics
Medalists at the 2012 Summer Olympics
Medalists at the 2016 Summer Olympics
Medalists at the 2020 Summer Olympics
Expatriate handball players
Norwegian expatriate sportspeople in Denmark
Norwegian expatriate sportspeople in Romania
Sportspeople from Tromsø
Viborg HK players
Handball players at the 2020 Summer Olympics